The Fulton Chain Railway was incorporated as the Fulton Chain Railroad in 1896, and opened that year. After reorganization in 1902, the company, then operated by the New York Central Railroad, was renamed the Fulton Chain Railway. The New York Central gained control of the company in 1917, and operated its line until July 11, 1932. A short stub at the Fulton Chain end remained the property of the company until January 1, 1937, when the Fulton Chain Railway was merged into the New York Central.

References

External links 

 Map of the Fulton Chain Railway with ICC abandonment filing

Defunct New York (state) railroads
Railway companies established in 1902
Railway companies disestablished in 1937
Predecessors of the New York Central Railroad